Newburg Township is a township in Mitchell County, Iowa, USA.

History
Newburg Township was established about 1858.

References

Townships in Mitchell County, Iowa
Townships in Iowa